Greater Glasgow is an urban settlement in Scotland consisting of all localities which are physically attached to the city of Glasgow, forming with it a single contiguous urban area (or conurbation). It does not relate to municipal government boundaries and its territorial extent is defined by the General Register Office for Scotland, which determines settlements in Scotland for census and statistical purposes. Greater Glasgow had a population of 1,199,629 at the time of the 2001 UK Census making it the largest urban area in Scotland and the fifth-largest in the United Kingdom. However, the population estimate for the Greater Glasgow 'settlement' (a chain of continuously populated postcodes) in mid-2016 was 985,290 – the reduced figure explained by the removal of the Motherwell & Wishaw (124,790), Coatbridge & Airdrie (91,020) and Hamilton (83,730) settlement areas east of the city due to small gaps between the populated postcodes. The 'new towns' of Cumbernauld (which had a 2016 settlement population of 50,920) and East Kilbride (75,120) were never included in these figures despite their close ties to Glasgow due to having a clear geographical separation from the city. In the 2020 figures (with almost the same boundaries as 2016, the main difference being the re-addition of Barrhead), the Greater Glasgow population  had risen to just over 1 million.

A more extensive Greater Glasgow concept covers a much larger area, and may include Ayrshire down to Ayr as well as the whole of Lanarkshire down to Lanark, Dunbartonshire, Renfrewshire and Inverclyde. At present the Glasgow City Region consists of the Glasgow City Council, North Lanarkshire, South Lanarkshire, West Dunbartonshire, East Dunbartonshire, Renfrewshire, East Renfrewshire and Inverclyde Local Authorities with a combined population of over 1.7 million. This city-region is described as a metropolitan area by its own strategic planning authority, and is similar to the Glasgow metropolitan area identified by the European Union.

The City of Glasgow grew substantially in population during the late-nineteenth and early-twentieth centuries, becoming in 1912 the eighth city in Europe to reach the one million mark after Rome, London, Paris, Berlin, Vienna, St Petersburg and Moscow. The official population stayed over a million for fifty years. Since the 1960s, successive boundary changes and large-scale relocation to suburban districts and new towns have reduced the population of the City of Glasgow council area to 593,245 at the time of the 2011 UK Census.

Urban Area
Following the local government boundary changes in 1996 and the creation of unitary councils in Scotland, replacing the former regional and district councils, the Greater Glasgow Settlement Area or Urban Area was created for the 2001 Census from groups of neighbouring urban postcodes grouped so that each group of postcode units (known as a locality) contains at least a given number of addresses per unit area, and the group contains at least 500 residents. The localities that make up Greater Glasgow are listed below:

Transport

In 1973, the Greater Glasgow Passenger Transport Executive was created to take over control of Glasgow Corporation Transport (which included the Glasgow Subway). Following local government reorganisation in 1975, control subsequently passed to Strathclyde Regional Council. The former PTE is now the Strathclyde Partnership for Transport, within Transport Scotland.

The city is served by the only metro system in Scotland, the Glasgow Subway; and by two international airports, Glasgow Prestwick Airport and Glasgow Airport.

Glasgow City Region
The Glasgow City Region is a collection of local authorities clustered around Glasgow. The eight constituent authorities are:

 Glasgow
 East Dunbartonshire
 West Dunbartonshire
 North Lanarkshire
 South Lanarkshire
 East Renfrewshire
 Renfrewshire
 Inverclyde

The population of this area in 2011 was 1,787,515. The city region is not a conurbation as significant parts of the council areas (and the whole of Inverclyde) are separated from Greater Glasgow by open countryside.  It uses numerous other terms for itself, including Metropolitan Glasgow, the metropolitan City-Region of Glasgow, Glasgow and the Clyde Valley and Clydeside.

As a collection of individual local authorities the city region has no single municipal government however, following the agreement of a City Deal with the UK Government, the eight constituent authorities formally established a joint Glasgow and Clyde Valley Cabinet on 20 January 2015. This cabinet consists of the leaders of all eight councils, with the leader of Glasgow City Council being Chair of the Cabinet. Prior to 2015 the eight authorities formed only a combined strategic planning authority.

Metropolitan Glasgow
While the Scottish Government makes no official recognition of 'Metropolitan status' in its workings, the term is used by other bodies.  The European Union's statistical body Eurostat lists Glasgow as the 32nd most populous metropolitan area, or Larger Urban Zones, in the EU. Although not defining the boundaries of this metropolitan area, Eurostat state it consists "of over 1.7 million inhabitants covering an area of 3,346 km2"., which is similar to the 1.75 million population of the Glasgow City Region and may suggest a correlation between the two.  The Glasgow City Region's strategic development authority describes itself as the planning authority for the "Glasgow metropolitan area" and the "metropolitan city-region of Glasgow".

The former local government region of Strathclyde has also been identified as a metropolitan area surrounding the Greater Glasgow conurbation, and covers approximately 2.3 million people, 41% of Scotland's population.

See also
Central Belt

References

 
Metropolitan areas of the United Kingdom
Urban areas of the United Kingdom